Dagnis Iļjins (born 20 August 1992) is a Latvian canoeist. He represented his country at the 2016 Summer Olympics.

References

External links 
 
 
 
 

1992 births
Living people
Latvian male canoeists
Canoeists at the 2016 Summer Olympics
Olympic canoeists of Latvia
People from Talsi